"We'll Be the Stars" is a song recorded by American singer Sabrina Carpenter from her debut studio album Eyes Wide Open (2015). The track was written by Skyler Stonestreet, Cameron Walker and its producer Steven Solomon. The song was released by Hollywood Records as the lead single from Eyes Wide Open on January 13, 2015, and was premiered a day before exclusively on Radio Disney. "We'll Be the Stars" is a midtempo piano-driven power pop ballad and lyrically, according to Carpenter, it talks about reaching dreams.

It was accompanied by a music video directed by Sarah McClung premiered on her Vevo channel on February 20, 2015. Carpenter promoted "We'll Be the Stars" with several live performances, including on Radio Disney Music Awards 2015, where she did a medley with her single "Eyes Wide Open".

Background and recording
After releasing her first EP, Can't Blame a Girl for Trying, Carpenter was ready to release an album, and to promote the album, "We'll Be the Stars" was chosen as the lead single. Carpenter announced on 6 January 2015 that she will be releasing "We'll Be the Stars" next week, writing on Twitter: "Hey guys exciting news!! My new single is called 'We'll Be The Stars' & I can't wait for you to hear it!!! Out 1/13!!". The announcement came with the song's cover art. In an interview with Radio Disney, Carpenter expressed what was the song about and why she chose the song as the lead single by saying "it's definitely a song about dreams. You look up on the sky there's so many possibilities and I think it's the song, the sky is the limit you can never go too far and you can never dream to big, no dream is ever too big. That's definitely a lesson I like to listen to and I'm excited for everybody else to hear."

"We'll Be the Stars" was written in 2014 by Skyler Stonestreet, Cameron Walker and Steven Solomon. The song was produced and mixed by Solomon and it was recorded at Sleepwalker Studios, located in Los Angeles, California. The song was mastered by Eric Boulanger at The Mastering Lab, Inc., located in Ojai, California.

Composition and lyrical interpretation
Musically, "We'll Be the Stars" is a three minutes and seven seconds piano-driven midtempo power pop ballad with country and pop rock influences. In terms of music notation, "We'll Be the Stars" was composed using  common time in the key of F major, with a moderate pop tempo of 80-84 beats per minute. The song follows the chord progression of F5–Bsus2-Dm-C and Carpenter's vocal range spans from the low note E3 to the high note of D5, giving the song almost two octaves of range.

According to Carpenter, the song talks about dreams.

Music video

Background and release
The music video was directed by Sarah McColgan and it was released on Vevo and YouTube on February 20, 2015. The behind the scenes of the music video was premiered on March 13, 2015 in the same platforms.

Critical reception
Taylor Weatherby of Billboard pointed ""We'll Be the Stars" as one of Carpenter's best songs by saying "Though Carpenter's voice is clearly great for dancier tracks, this track from her first album shows the vulnerable side to her sound -- and it's just as awesome as the more upbeat tunes."

Live performances
"We'll Be the Stars" was performed on Radio Disney Music Awards 2015, where she did a medley with her single "Eyes Wide Open". She performed the song at D23 Expo in 2015 along with "Take on the World", "Can't Blame a Girl for Trying", a cover of "FourFiveSeconds", "The Middle of Starting Over" and "Eyes Wide Open". The song was also performed on YTV Summer Beach Bash II, in August, 2015. She performed an acoustic version of the song on 2015 NASCAR Sprint Cup Series. In 2016, Carpenter performed the song on the Honda Stage at the iHeartRadio Theater LA along with some covers and songs from his first and second album.

Credits and personnel
Recording and management
Recorded at Sleepwalker Studios (Los Angeles, California)
Mastered at The Mastering Lab, Inc. (Ojai, California)
Warner-Tamerlane Publishing Corp. (BMI) and Stonestreet Works administered by Warner-Tamerlane Publishing Corp., Third And Verse Avenue (ASCAP), All rights administered by Kobalt Songs Music Publishing (ASCAP)

Personnel

Sabrina Carpenter – lead vocals
Skyler Stonestreet – songwriting
Cameron Walker – songwriting
Steven Solomon – songwriting, production, mixing
Eric Boulanger – mastering

Credits adapted from Eyes Wide Open liner notes.

Release history

References

2015 singles
2015 songs
2010s ballads
Pop ballads
Sabrina Carpenter songs
Hollywood Records singles
Songs written by Skyler Stonestreet
American power pop songs